Sir William Henry Hoare Vincent, GCIE, KCSI (1 April 1866 – 17 April 1941), was a Welsh civil servant and diplomat.

The youngest son of James Crawley Vincent and grandson of the dean of Bangor, he was educated at Christ College, Brecon and Trinity College, Dublin.  In 1887 he joined the Indian Civil Service, rising to vice-president of the legislative council of India and a member of the Council of India from 1923 to 1931.

Knighted in 1913, Vincent was India's representative at the League of Nations in 1926.  He returned to Wales in 1931 and became treasurer of the University College of North Wales, Bangor. He was the brother of Sir Hugh Corbet Vincent.

Vincent was knighted in 1913, created a KCSI in 1918 and a GCIE in 1922.

References

1866 births
1941 deaths
Welsh diplomats
Knights Bachelor
Indian Civil Service (British India) officers
Knights Commander of the Order of the Star of India
Knights Grand Commander of the Order of the Indian Empire
Members of the Council of India
High Sheriffs of Anglesey
Judges of the Calcutta High Court
Members of the Council of the Governor General of India